Nisar Afridi (born 20 October 1999) is a Pakistani cricketer. He made his first-class debut for Federally Administered Tribal Areas in the 2017–18 Quaid-e-Azam Trophy on 2 November 2017.

References

External links
 
 Nisar Afridi at the Pakistan Cricket Board official website

1999 births
Living people
Pakistani cricketers
Place of birth missing (living people)
Federally Administered Tribal Areas cricketers